[[

]]

 

The Miss California's Teen competition is the pageant that selects the representative for the U.S. state of California in the Miss America's Teen pageant. 

Olivia DeFrank of Los Angeles was crowned Miss California's Outstanding Teen on June 24, 2022 at the DoubleTree by Hilton in Fresno, California. She competed in the Miss America's Outstanding Teen 2023 pageant at the Hyatt Regency Dallas in Dallas, Texas on August 12, 2022 where she was in the Top 11 along being 1st runner-up for the Teens in Action award.

In January of 2023, the official name of the pageant was changed from Miss California’s Outstanding Teen, to Miss California’s Teen, in accordance with the national pageant.

Results summary
The following is a visual summary of the past results of Miss California's Outstanding Teen titleholders presented in the table below. The year in parentheses indicates year of the Miss America's Outstanding Teen competition in which the placement and/or award was garnered.

Placements 

 1st runners-up: Arianna Afsar (2006)
 4th runners-up: Monica Stainer (2010)
 Top 9:  Cameron Doan (2019)
 Top 10: Crystal Lee (2009)
 Top 11: Olivia DeFrank (2023)
 Top 12: Grace Grant (2013)
 Top 15: Jessa Carmack (2012)

Awards

Preliminary awards 
 Preliminary Evening Wear/On-Stage Question: Monica Stainer (2010), Cameron Doan (2019)
 Preliminary Lifestyle and Fitness: Crystal Lee (2009)
 Preliminary Talent: Arianna Afsar (2006), Monica Stainer (2010)

Other awards 

 Community Service Award: Shelby Sinkler (2011)
 Teens in Action 1st Runner-up: Olivia DeFrank (2023)

Winners

References

External links
 Official website

California
California culture
Women in California
Annual events in California
1999 establishments in California